Lake Marion is a lake in McLeod County, in the U.S. state of Minnesota.

Lake Marion was named for Marion Hoag, the daughter of settler Charles Hoag.

See also
List of lakes in Minnesota

References

Lakes of Minnesota
Lakes of McLeod County, Minnesota